Bobby Gray was an American boxer who lived in San Jose, California.  He was active from 1922 to 1937.

Boxing career 
Bobby Gray started off his career with a draw against Ernie Owens.  He won his next three fights, but lost the next one to Johnny Welch.  He fought in many more fights afterwards.  His total career record came out to 74 wins (11 by KO), 54 losses, and 35 draws.  Overall, he had competed in over 164 fights (with one draw by newspaper decision).

References

External links

Lightweight boxers
American male boxers
Year of birth missing
Year of death missing